This is a list of media in Saint John, New Brunswick.

Radio

Television
 Channel 9 / Cable 8: CKLT-DT, CTV
 Channel 12 / Cable 6: CHNB-DT, Global (semi-satellite of CIHF-DT Halifax)
 Cable 10 Rogers Television

Newspapers
The Telegraph-Journal, (daily)
Le Saint-Jeannois (monthly)
West Side Tides (weekly)
Coffee News (weekly)
WesTides (Bi-weekly)

Saint John

Media, Saint John